Acacia shuttleworthii is a shrub of the genus Acacia and the subgenus Phyllodineae that is endemic to western Australia.

Description
Like most species of Acacia it has phyllodes rather than true leaves. It blooms from October to December and produces cream-white flowers.

Taxonomy
The species was first formally described by the botanist Carl Meissner in 1844 as a part of Johann Georg Christian Lehmanns work Plantae Preissianae. It was reclassified as Racosperma shuttleworthii in 2003 by Leslie Pedley then transferred back to genus Acacia in 2006.

Distribution
It is native to an area in the Wheatbelt region of Western Australia where it is found on hills and breakaways growing in lateritic soils. It has a disjunct distribution from around Dandaragan in the north to around Gnowangerup in the south growing in gravelly clay and sandy soils as a part of Eucalyptus wandoo woodland communities.

See also
 List of Acacia species

References

shuttleworthii
Acacias of Western Australia
Taxa named by Carl Meissner
Plants described in 1844